Matthew Turner, Mathew Turner, or Matt Turner may refer to:

Sports
 Matt Turner (baseball) (1967–2019), American Major League Baseball pitcher
 Matt Turner (soccer) (born 1994), American soccer goalkeeper
 Mathew Turner (born 1988), South Africa-born English rugby union player
 Matthew Turner (chess player) (born 1975), British chess grandmaster
 Matthew Turner (cricketer) (born 1973), English cricketer
 Matthew Turner (footballer) (born 1981), English footballer

Other
 Matt Turner (murder victim), one of Jeffrey Dahmer's 17 victims
 Matt Turner (Neighbours), a fictional character from the Australian soap opera Neighbours
 Matthew Turner (physician) (died 1788), British physician, author and atheist
 Matthew Turner (shipbuilder) (1825–1909), American sea captain, shipbuilder and designer